The British Quarterly Review was a periodical published between 1845 and 1886. It was founded by Robert Vaughan, out of dissatisfaction with the editorial line of the Eclectic Review under Edward Miall.

Editors
Robert Vaughan for its first 20 years.
1866–74 Henry Robert Reynolds.
1866–86 Henry Allon, initially with Reynolds.

References

Quarterly magazines published in the United Kingdom
Defunct literary magazines published in the United Kingdom
Magazines established in 1845
Magazines disestablished in 1886